Richard John Forrester Mayston CBE was an Anglican priest.

He was born in Dublin on 23 January 1907, educated at Trinity College, Dublin and ordained in 1931. He began his career with a curacy in Holywood. Commissioned into the Royal Army Chaplains' Department, he served until 1958. He then became Provost of Leicester Cathedral, a post he held until his death on 13 May 1963.

Notes

1907 births
Alumni of Trinity College Dublin
Royal Army Chaplains' Department officers
Commanders of the Order of the British Empire
Provosts and Deans of Leicester
1963 deaths